Richard Ludha (born 8 November 2000) is a Slovak footballer who plays for Železiarne Podbrezová as a goalkeeper.

Club career

FK Železiarne Podbrezová
Ludha made his debut for Železiarne Podbrezová against Nitra on 16 February 2019.

International career
Ludha was first recognised in a Slovak senior national team nomination in September 2022, in a premier nomination of newly arriving national team manager Francesco Calzona, ahead of two 2022–23 UEFA Nations League C against Azerbaijan and Belarus. While he was omitted for November friendlies, he also appeared as an alternate for December 2022 national team prospect players' training camp.

References

External links
 FK Železiarne Podbrezová official club profile 
 
 Futbalnet profile 
 

2000 births
Living people
People from Prievidza
Sportspeople from the Trenčín Region
Slovak footballers
Association football goalkeepers
FK Železiarne Podbrezová players
Slovak Super Liga players
2. Liga (Slovakia) players